Kent Carlsson was the defending champion but was forced to forfeit the rest of the season, due to a knee injury that was suffered in August.

Martín Jaite won the title by defeating Mats Wilander 7–6(7–5), 6–4, 4–6, 0–6, 6–4 in the final.

Seeds

Draw

Finals

Top half

Section 1

Section 2

Bottom half

Section 3

Section 4

References

External links
 Official results archive (ATP)
 Official results archive (ITF)

1987 Grand Prix (tennis)